Beugny is a commune in the Pas-de-Calais department in the Hauts-de-France region in northern France.

Geography
A farming village located 20 miles (32 km) southeast of Arras at the junction of the N30 and D20  roads.

Population

Sights
 The church of St. Géry, rebuilt, like most of the village, after the ravages of World War I.
 The ruins of a chateau.

See also
Communes of the Pas-de-Calais department

References

Communes of Pas-de-Calais